Emil Meyer may refer to:
Emil Meyer (linotype operator) (1862–?), linotype operator and Socialist legislator from Milwaukee, Wisconsin
Emil Heinrich Meyer (1886–1945), German banker for the Third Reich

See also
Hannes Meyer (Hans Emil Meyer, 1889–1954), architect and Bauhaus theorist
Torben Meyer (Torbin Emil Meyer, 1884–1975), Danish character actor